Beatus of Lungern, known also by the honorific Apostle of Switzerland or as Beatus of Beatenberg or Beatus of Thun, was probably a legendary monk and hermit of early Christianity, and is revered as a saint. Though his legend states that he died in the 2nd century, it is likely that his story has been conflated with other saints of the same name, especially Beatus of Vendôme, and an Abbot Beatus who received a charter in 810 from Charlemagne to confirm that Honau Abbey would be administered by Irish monks.

Life
While legend claims that he was the son of a Scottish king, other legends place his birth in Ireland. Beatus was a convert, baptized in England by Saint Barnabas. He was allegedly ordained a priest in Rome by Saint Peter the Apostle, whereupon he was sent with a companion named Achates to evangelize the tribe of the Helvetii. The two set up a camp in Argovia near the Jura Mountains, where they converted many of the locals.

Beatus then ventured south to the mountains above Lake Thun, taking up a hermitage in what is now known as St. Beatus Caves, near the village of Beatenberg, probably in the ninth century. Tradition states that this cave is where he fought a dragon. Saint Beatus' grave is located between the monastery and the cave entrance. He died at an old age in 112 CE.

Monastery

An Augustinian monastery was established near the mouth of the St. Beatus Caves.  Today, approximately one kilometer of the cave system has been opened and illuminated for tourist access; the monastery site now also houses a restaurant and gift shop for the convenience of tourists.

Veneration
Beatus is primarily remembered as the first apostle to Switzerland. The cultus of Beatus was widespread in the Middle Ages and survived even the hostility of the Reformation period when pilgrims were driven back from his cave at spear-point by Zwinglian Protestants.  After this period of turmoil, Beatus' relics, and the focus of his cultus, were transferred to the chapel at Lungern, Obwalden. The mountain where he resided until his death is still a place of pilgrimage, and bears his name: Beatenberg.

Historicity
The earliest recorded accounts of St. Beatus' life date no earlier than the 10th and mid-11th centuries and have not been historically authenticated. So, some would hesitate to endorse the tradition that calls St. Beatus the "Apostle of Switzerland". Indeed, Saint Gall probably more justly deserves this honor.

Gallery

References

External links
Caves of St. Beatus
Beatus at the Kathpedia

Converts to Christianity from pagan religions
Swiss saints
112 deaths
2nd-century Christian saints
Year of birth unknown
Helvetii